Mélanie Meillard (born 23 September 1998) is a Swiss World Cup alpine ski racer, who specialises in the technical events of Slalom and Giant slalom. Meillard made her World Cup debut at age 17 in December 2015; her older brother Loic is also a World Cup alpine racer.

In December 2019 and January 2020, Meillard attempted a comeback, but ended the season after three races without a countable result. She finally managed to return to the top of the world at the beginning of the 2020/21 season, when she finished ninth in the Levi slalom. At the end of the season, she was able to win the Swiss championship title in the slalom for the second time after 2017 at the end of March. In the giant slalom she finished in 3rd place.

World Cup results

Season standings

Standings through 19 December 2018

Race podiums

 1 podium – (1 PS) 
 15 top tens

World Championship results

References

External links

Mélanie Meillard World Cup standings at the International Ski Federation

Swiss Ski team – official site – 
  – 

1998 births
Living people
People from Neuchâtel
Swiss female alpine skiers
Alpine skiers at the 2016 Winter Youth Olympics
Youth Olympic gold medalists for Switzerland
Sportspeople from the canton of Neuchâtel
21st-century Swiss women
Youth Olympic silver medalists for Switzerland